Rincon 1 was a CubeSat built by the Student Satellite Program of the University of Arizona. The primary payload was furnished by Rincon Research, hence the name. Rincon 1 was the product of the work of about 50 students, ranging from college freshmen to Ph.D. students, over the course of several years. It was launched, after being postponed several times, on board a Dnepr on July 26, 2006, but the rocket failed and the satellite was destroyed.

Listening

If the launch had been successful, persons on the ground would have needed this information to be able to hear the beacons from the satellite.

 The keplerian elements, in order to know where the satellite is pointed.
 A radio capable of operating on 436.870 MHz, which will change with doppler shifting. There is also a beacon operating on 437.345 MHz. It is a very weak signal.
 A 1200 baud AFSK modem, preferably a very low-end, that does no modulation on its own. Cubesat Groundstation uses a custom-built hardware modem, and possibly a software modem (using the sound card as an Analog-to-Digital converter).
 The Cubesat GS software would help, however, it is not currently available to the public.
 A good antenna system, the design of the antennas is not optimal.

Components
Rincon 1 had the following components included:
6 solar cells
Aluminum frame - built to spin-stabilize through sunlight
Power board (used to hold batteries, maintain 5V and 3.3V charges, measure voltages and currents in several spots, and convert the power from the solar cells to usable power.)
Microcontroller board, which is used to gather and transmit telemetry
Radio board, which is used for 2 way communication
Experiment - Contains a 10 mW beacon board, which is being used by Rincon Research to prove new technologies

Specifications
These specifications are without respect to the payload.
Dimensions - 10 cm×10 cm×10 cm
Mass - max 1 kg (Actual ~900 gram)
Power Generation - Optimum ~2 W, average on sun side ~1.5 W
Max power output - 3W when transmitting data
Min power output - 400 mW when in quiet state

Current status
Rincon 1 was launched with UA's satellite, SACRED on a Dnepr rocket on July 26, 2006 at 19:43 UTC. The launch failed shortly after takeoff.

See also 

List of CubeSats

External links
University of Arizona SSP website (Outdated)
University of Arizona Cubesat website (official) (Outdated)
Cubesat Wiki Most up-to-date website

Satellite launch failures
University of Arizona
Spacecraft launched in 2006
CubeSats
Spacecraft launched by Dnepr rockets
Space accidents and incidents in Kazakhstan